Does It Pay? is a lost 1923 American silent society drama film directed by Charles Horan and starring Hope Hampton. It was produced and distributed by Fox Film Corporation.

Cast
Hope Hampton as Doris Clark
Robert T. Haines as John Weston
Florence Short as Martha Weston
Walter Petri as Jack Weston
Peggy Shaw as Alice Weston
Charles Wellesley as Senator Delafield
Mary Thurman as Marion
Claude Brooke as Attorney Alden
Pierre Gendron as Harold Reed
Roland Bottomley as Francois Chavelle
Marie Shotwell as Mrs. Clark
Ben Grauer as The Boy

References

External links

1923 films
American silent feature films
Lost American films
Fox Film films
American black-and-white films
Silent American drama films
1923 drama films
1923 lost films
Lost drama films
1920s American films